The PumpHouse Theatre is an artist-led arts centre that presents theatre and other events in the North Shore of Auckland, New Zealand.

Historic pumphouse 
The pumphouse was originally built on the shore of Lake Pupuke as a pumping stations to provide freshwater for the local community. The building was opened in 1906. The pumping machinery was removed in 1931 when a new water supply was sourced from the Waitakere Ranges, and the building was used for water treatment until it was closed in 1941. The building then began to fall into disrepair. In 1968 two hundred people attended a public meeting in support of preserving the building and turning it into an arts venue. Things got heated as local residents clashed with council and North Shore Horticultural Society who also wanted the land. The casting vote of Mayor Fred Thomas saved the building and local residents began work to renovate and convert the derelict building into a community theatre and arts centre.

In 1983, the PumpHouse was classified as a Category II Historic Building by The New Zealand Historic Places Trust (now Heritage New Zealand).

Establishment of the theatre 
The North Shore Theatre and Arts Trust (The Pumphouse Theatre) was established as a Registered Charitable Trust in 1971. Major fundraising began with the establishment of the annual "PumpHouse Picnics".

The PumpHouse was converted to a theatre and arts centre, and opened in 1977 by Takapuna City Council Mayor Fred Thomas. Margaret Escott was a founding member of the trust board and was a writer and director. She wrote the play Saved that opened the theatre, a melodrama set in colonial Auckland. She died in the same year and it is said her ghost haunts the greenroom. 

The updated trust deed of the North Shore Theatre and Arts Trust, as filed in December 2018, states that the objectives of the trust include: 

The PumpHouse has three main areas available for events:
 a theatre-style auditorium seating 190
 an outdoor amphitheatre seating 200 
 a studio space seating 50

In 2017, the main auditorium was renamed the Genevieve Becroft Auditorium.  This was to recognise the contribution of Genevieve Becroft towards saving the historic pumphouse building, and her role as patron of the arts.

References

External links
 Official website
 PumpHouse timeline booklet
 RNZ interview on 40th anniversary of The PumpHouse Theatre
  Haunted Auckland research and public events archive
Buildings and structures in Auckland
Theatres in Auckland
Heritage New Zealand Category 2 historic places in the Auckland Region
North Shore, New Zealand